Pearl.com is an "online paid question-and-answer service" based in San Francisco. "People aren't always willing to wait" in "legal, medical and other advice" led to "a growing number of those help-seekers are getting their guidance online."

History
Pearl.com began in 2003 as JustAnswer. Founder Andy Kurtzig had previously begun (and subsequently sold) a software company automating newspaper classifieds called Anser, a pun on his mother's ASK Group's name. The time period from attempting to obtaining funding until attaining significant revenue was described as "unusually long:" nine years. Once up and running, their offerings included traditionally high-priced fields such as law and medicine, but also "assistance from computer technicians and relationship counselors." By 2014, based on "the regulatory landscape involved" Pearl undertook to "overhaul" their expert teams.

Controversy
Regarding providing legal advice for "$30 to $40" and glossing over "details that could more easily emerge face to face" founder Andy Kurtzig conceded that an in-person followup may be needed. He said to The Wall Street Journal his service enables "to get key insights that will cut your appointment time from three hours to less than an hour.”

References

History of software